Coccothrinax proctorii, the Cayman thatch palm or Proctor's silver palm, is a palm which is endemic to the Cayman Islands.

Henderson and colleagues (1995) considered C. proctorii to be a synonym of Coccothrinax argentata. It is considered Endangered by the IUCN Red List, having declined to about 435,699 mature individuals in 2000 from a projected original population of 600,000. This population has still continued declining, and the projected 2013 population is around 428,500 mature individuals. In a century, the population will have likely declined to only about 123,500 individuals, all restricted to protected areas.

Description
A medium-sized palm, with a slender trunk, and an open crown, of deeply divided leaves, with nearly perfectly symmetrical divisions, dark green above, and silvery white below. Trunk type: Solitary. Prefers a sunny, moist, but well-drained position. Salt tolerant, and prefers an alkaline soil. Slow growing. Can be grown on just coral limerock. It likes a position in full sun, or light shade, in a tropical, or subtropical climate, and once established, can endure quite a bit of coastal exposure. Indoors it also makes a neat bonsai, that can even be cultivated just on a piece of coral limerock, practically without soil.

References

proctorii
Trees of the Cayman Islands
Plants described in 1980